is a former Japanese football player.

Playing career
Asuki Oishi played for Zweigen Kanazawa from 2013 to 2015.

References

External links

1991 births
Living people
Tokoha University alumni
Association football people from Shizuoka Prefecture
Japanese footballers
J2 League players
J3 League players
Japan Football League players
Zweigen Kanazawa players
Association football midfielders